The following is a list of county-maintained roads in Lake of the Woods County, Minnesota, United States. Some of the routes included in this list are also county-state-aid-highways (CSAH.)

Route list

References

 

Lake of the Woods
Transportation in Lake of the Woods County, Minnesota
Lake of the Woods